Keith Harkin (born on  in Derry, Northern Ireland) is a singer and songwriter. He became famous when he joined Irish music group, Celtic Thunder. After nearly ten years with the group, Harkin decided to take some time off and tour on his own. He now resides in Los Angeles, California with his wife Kelsey. On 10 May 2019, Harkin announced the birth of the couple's son via Instagram.

Musical career

In 2005, Harkin travelled to London and recorded with a producer, and played in various venues and festivals throughout England, including the Tavistock Festival on Portobello Road. In 2006, Harkin was picked to play the lead role in Dha Theanga, an Irish program on BBC. He also rewrote and arranged all of the music. Harkin was invited to support John Martyn and David Kitt on their Irish tours. BBC Radio Ulster has referred to Harkin as the "Irish Jack Johnson".

Harkin was part of Celtic Thunder, performing in the United States, Canada and Australia. Celtic Thunder has had two #1 selling DVDs and three #1 selling albums on the World Billboard charts.  Harkin began working with Celtic thunder in 2007. He plays the guitar and piano and wrote "Lauren and I" for Celtic Thunder. Harkin has now recorded more original songs apart from Celtic Thunder; some titles include: "How I Wish", "Daisy Fields", "Vanity", "September Sessions", and "All Day Long".

Harkin's self-titled solo album was released in Canada on 4 September 2012 and in the United States on 18 September 2012. Harkin's first solo album was released with Verve Records who the Grammy Award-winning producer David Foster signed him to. Long-awaited by fans, the album reached #8 spot in Amazon's Pop Music Charts and #1 spot in Amazon's International charts two months before the release date. On the album, is a heartwarming duet with the two-time Grammy Award winner, Colbie Caillat. They cover Van Morrison's "Have I Told You Lately That I Love You" as the third track on the album.

Harkin's second solo album was released in October 2015. The songs on Harkin's second solo album on Mercy Street were written by Harkin and he completely funded the album, the album reached number one on World music Billboard charts. Collaborations with Gavin Goldberg and Andy Wright guided Harkin to make it his own style.  Harkin recorded all the songs on the album live and in only one take.

Harkin released a solo Christmas album titled Nollaig in 2016 which also reached number one on World music Billboard charts.  It was recorded at his home studio with the help of Brian Byrne who produced the album.  The album has a mix of original and traditional songs and he is accompanied by the Bulgarian Symphony Orchestra for several songs.

Harkin is currently working on his 8th Studio Record to be released fall 2022

Harkin is sponsored by McPherson Guitars.

Discography
Keith Harkin Debut Album (Sept 2012)

 "End of the Innocence"
 "Daisy Fields"
 "Have I Told You Lately"
 "Everybody's Talkin'"
 "Nothing But You and I"
 "Here Comes The Sun"
 "Tears of Hercules"
 "Orange Moon"
 "Take It Away"
 "Don't Forget About Me"
 "Rosa"
 "Heart of Saturday Night"

''Mercy Street (March 2016) "Mercy"
 "I Remember It All"
 "Take Me Down"
 "September Sessions"
 "Wait on Me"
 "First Time"
 "Lauren & I"
 "My Love Goes On"
 "Keep on Rolling"
 "Along The Road"
 "Risk The Fall"
 "Old Lang Syne"Nollaig (2016) "Driving Home For Christmas"
 "Merry Christmas You've Been on My Mind"
 "The River"
 "Arthur McBride"
 "In The Bleak Mid Winter"
 "Have Yourself A Merry Little Christmas"
 "2000 Miles"
 "God Rest Ye Merry Gentlemen"
 "No Love Dyring"
 "Silent Night"
 "Auld Lang Syne"In The Round (2017) "Lauren & I"
 "I Remember it all"
 "Along The Road"
 "Take Me Down"
 "First Time"
 "Whiskey in the Jar"
 "Risk The Fall"
 "Mercy"
 "Ring Tailed Rat"
 "Carefree Heart"
 "My Love Goes On"
 "September Sessions"
 "Keep on Rolling"
 "Wait ON Me"Ten Years Later" (2019) "When We Go Out"
 "How I Wish"
 "Daisy Fields"
 "All Day Long"
 "Going to San Diego"
 "Small Town Girl"
 "Banjo Song"
 "Looking Glass"
 "Going Home"
 "She's Almost"
 "Calling Baton Rouge"Its Christmas Time (2019) "Merry of May"
 "First of May"
 "My Old Friend"
 "I Say Mommy Kissing Santa Clause"
 "Silent NIght"
 "Its Christmas Time"
 "Jingle Bells"Santa Please Come Home'' (2021)

 "The River"
 "Can't Help Falling in Love with You"
 "Santa Please Come Home"
 "Oh Holy Night"
 "Halleluja"
 "Have Yourself A Merry Little Christmas"

Solo singles
 "Daisy Fields" (Keith Harkin, 2012)
 "September Sessions" (Mercy Street, 2015)
 "Mercy" (Mercy Street, 2015)
 "Don't Forget About Me" (Keith Harkin, 2012)
 "Nothing But You & I" (Keith Harkin, 2012)

References

External links
 

Living people
1986 births
Singer-songwriters from Northern Ireland
Folk musicians from Northern Ireland
Musicians from Derry (city)